The March for Science was a series of protests that occurred across the United States and around the World on April 22, 2017. The protests were organized due to the perceived hostility of the Trump administration, as well as proposed budget cuts to federal agencies such as the Environmental Protection Agency and the National Institute of Health. A major goal of the march was convincing government officials to adopt policies in-line with the scientific understanding of issues such as climate change and vaccines. The organizers estimated that over one million people in 650 locations on all seven continents attended. Listed below are several hundreds of the affiliated marches.

March locations in the United States

March locations outside the United States
Listed below are 154 marches outside the United States in support of the 2017 March for Science.

International gallery

References

2017 protests
2017-related lists
Environmental protests
Lists of places
Lists of protests
Protest marches
Protests against Donald Trump
April 2017 events in India
Protests in India